Brian Drew Mallette (born January 19, 1975) is a former professional baseball pitcher.

Mallette was drafted by the Milwaukee Brewers in 1997, and he signed with the team on June 9. In 2002, Mallette was called up to the majors. He pitched five innings that season before being traded to the Los Angeles Dodgers in October. He began the 2003 season with the triple-A Las Vegas 51s, but pitched in just one game before being released. He was signed by the Buffaloes, and finished the season with them. In , he returned to North America, pitching for the Louisville Bats in the Cincinnati Reds organization.

Before the 2005 season, Mallette signed a minor league contract with the Pittsburgh Pirates. On April 6, while in triple-A, he was suspended for 30 games after failing his second drug test. He was granted free agency in October, ending his professional career.

See also
List of sportspeople sanctioned for doping offences

References

External links

Pura Pelota (Venezuelan Winter League) 

1975 births
Living people
American expatriate baseball players in Japan
American sportspeople in doping cases
Baseball players from Georgia (U.S. state)
Baseball players suspended for drug offenses
Beloit Snappers players
Columbus State Cougars baseball players
Helena Brewers players
Huntsville Stars players
Indianapolis Indians players
Kennesaw State Owls baseball players
Las Vegas 51s players
Louisville Bats players
Major League Baseball pitchers
Milwaukee Brewers players
Mudville Nine players
Osaka Kintetsu Buffaloes players
People from Dublin, Georgia
Stockton Ports players
Tiburones de La Guaira players
American expatriate baseball players in Venezuela